Al-Raba al-Sharqi is a sub-district located in Bilad Ar Rus District, Sana'a Governorate, Yemen. Al-Raba al-Sharqi had a population of 7726 according to the 2004 census.

References 

Sub-districts in Bilad Ar Rus District